Frank LaLoggia (born January 12, 1954) is an American film director, screenwriter, producer, and actor. LaLoggia appeared in several films before making his directorial debut with the horror film Fear No Evil (1981). His second feature was the mystery horror film Lady in White (1988), starring Lukas Haas and Alex Rocco.

Biography
LaLoggia was born into an Italian American family in Rochester, New York. He made his feature film debut as a director and writer with the horror film Fear No Evil (1981). His second directorial feature, Lady in White (1988), was partly based on his own upbringing, as well as a local legend in Rochester. Though a box-office bomb, Lady in White received favorable reviews. In 1989, LaLoggia appeared in a minor role in The Wizard of Speed and Time, before directing the made-for-television film Mother (1995), starring Diane Ladd and Olympia Dukakis.

Filmography

References

External links

1954 births
American male screenwriters
American writers of Italian descent
Film directors from New York (state)
People from Rochester, New York
Screenwriters from New York (state)
Living people
American people of Italian descent